The Canadian Country Music Association (CCMA) was founded in 1976 as the Academy of Country Music Entertainment to organize, promote and develop a Canadian country music industry. The groundwork for the association began on June 3rd, 1973 when a group of twelve entertainers, promoters and radio personalities met at The Horseshoe Tavern in Toronto, Ontario and formed a Board of Directors to help promote Canadian content. The group included Jury Krytiuk, president of Boot Records, Bod Dalton, a promotor, Sean Eyre, DJ Lindsay, radio personality Harold Moon who worked for BMI Records, Jack Starr of The Horseshoe Tavern, Barry Haugen of RCA Records, Vic Folliott of Brantford Radio, Mary Butterill of CAPAC Publishing and Ben Kerr who was a prominent promoter and Brent Williams, a notable country and bluegrass entertainer. This group was aided by future Country Music Awards organizer and Country Music Hall of Fame inductee Joe Talbot who flew up from Nasville especially for this meeting. The association changed its name to the Canadian Country Music Association in 1987.

Country Music Week is an annual event planned by the CCMA. It is hosted by a different Canadian city each year, and culminates with the CCMA Awards on the Sunday night. There are three components to Country Music Week: a music festival (which includes a Fan Fest, Legends Show, and Songwriters Series), the CCMA Awards show, and an industry conference (which includes workshops and seminars, networking events, and awards ceremonies).

Awards ceremonies

CCMA Awards
The CCMA held the first Canadian Country Music Awards ceremony in 1982. CCMA members vote in a three-stage ballot process to determine the winners of the awards. The first ballot consists of potential candidates nominated by the CCMA voting membership in a "write in" ballot. The top ten contenders for each award are presented in the second ballot period, where they are voted upon for the third (and final) ballot. In this ballot, the top five contenders are announced, who then go through to the awards show.

Since 2019, the CCMA Awards have been broadcast by Global, replacing previous broadcaster CBC Television.

2019

2018

2017

2016

2015

2014

2013

2012

2011

2010

2009

2008

2007

2006

2005

2004

2003

2002

2001

2000

1999

1998

1997

1996

1995

1994

1993

1992

1991

1990

1989

1988

1987

1986

1985

1984

1983

1982

Insurance
In 2013, Front Row Insurance Brokers Inc. initiated an online musical instrument insurance program for members of various Canadian music associations, including the CCMA.

See also

Canadian Country Music Hall of Fame
CMT (Canada)

References

External links
Official site

Music industry associations

Music organizations based in Canada
1976 establishments in Canada